The Hockenheimring Baden-Württemberg is a motor racing circuit situated in the Rhine valley near the town of Hockenheim in Baden-Württemberg, Germany, located on the Bertha Benz Memorial Route. Amongst other motor racing events, it has hosted the German Grand Prix, most recently in 2019. The circuit has very little differences in elevation. The circuit has an FIA Grade 1 license.

History

1932–1938
Originally called "Dreieckskurs" (triangle course), the Hockenheimring was built in 1932. The man behind it is Ernst Christ, a young timekeeper who felt that a racing track should be built in his hometown of Hockenheim. He submitted the plans to the mayor and they were approved on Christmas day, in 1931. This first layout of the track was around twelve kilometres long and consisted of a large triangle-like section, a hairpin in the city and two straights connecting them.

1938–1965

In 1938, the circuit dramatically shortened, from twelve kilometres down to just over seven and a half, and the Ostkurve corner, which lasted until 2001, was introduced for the first time.  In that year, the track was also renamed to "Kurpfalzring".  The track was damaged by tanks during World War II. After the war, the track was repaired, and renamed to "Hockenheimring". Former DKW and NSU factory rider and world record setter Wilhelm Herz became the manager of the track in 1954 and promoted the track successfully; Grand Prix motorcycle racing events were held, with the German motorcycle Grand Prix alternating between the Hockenheimring and other tracks.  This version of the circuit was just over seven and a half kilometres long and consisted of the original two long straights, with the Ostkurve in the forest and the original hairpin inside Hockenheim joining them together.

1965–2001
In 1965, when the new Autobahn A 6 separated the village from the main part of the track, a new version of Hockenheim circuit was built, with the "Motodrom" stadium section, designed by John Hugenholtz, who also designed Suzuka. After Jim Clark was killed on 7 April 1968 in a Formula 2 racing accident, two fast chicanes were added and the track was lined with crash barriers in 1970. A small memorial was placed near the first chicane (which was named after him), at the site of his accident. In 1982, another chicane was added at the Ostkurve (east curve), after Patrick Depailler was killed there in 1980, and the first chicane was made slower as well. For the 1992 German Grand Prix, the Ostkurve was changed yet again, from a quick left turn into a more complex right-left-right chicane, after Érik Comas crashed there in 1991. The second chicane was renamed after Ayrton Senna, after his death at the 1994 San Marino Grand Prix.

This made the setting up of racing cars difficult, since a choice had to be made – whether to run low downforce to optimize speed through the straights and compromise grip in the stadium section, or vice versa. The long track length also meant that a typical Formula One race had only 45 laps, limiting the spectators' experience of the race to only that many passes through the stadium.

During the mid-1980s "turbo era" of Formula One where fuel was restricted to either 220 (1984–1985), 195 (1986–1987) or 150 (1988) litres for races for the turbo powered cars, Hockenheim also saw drivers, including World Champion Alain Prost, at times fail to finish due to simply running out of fuel near the end of the race. Prost ran out at the end of the 1986 race, pushing his McLaren towards the line before giving up. He was placed 3rd when he ran dry and was eventually classified 6th, gaining a valuable championship point that would help him with his second World Championship.

Many problems came to light during the 2000 German Grand Prix, which was won by Brazilian driver Rubens Barrichello from having started 18th on the grid. The race finished in changeable weather conditions, with pouring rain in the stadium sector and almost completely dry forest straights. All the overtaking moves that took place during the race were in the chicanes of the forest sector, meaning hardly any spectators saw most of the best action. Midway through the race, a former Mercedes-Benz employee, who had been dismissed, breached the track's security barriers on the first forest straight, showing vulnerable security facilities in the forest and leading to the deployment of the safety car that neutralized a comfortable lead for the two Mercedes-powered McLarens. Later on, French driver Jean Alesi collided with Brazilian Pedro Diniz in the braking zone for the third chicane and his car spun uncontrollably down the track, which caused him to suffer dizziness for three days.

These events prompted much protest from the FIA to greatly improve spectator viewing, safety, and security at the track, claiming that the track was no longer suited to modern Formula One racing.

2002 redesign

In the early 2000s, F1 officials demanded the  track be shortened and threatened to discontinue racing there, threatening to relocate to other tracks such as the EuroSpeedway Lausitz and sites in Asia. The state government of Baden-Württemberg secured the financing for the redesign by Hermann Tilke for the 2002 German Grand Prix. The stadium section remained mostly intact, despite a new surface and a tighter Turn 1 ("Nordkurve"). However, the circuit was dramatically shortened, with the long, forested straights section chopped off in favour of more tight corners. More than half of the first straight and almost all of the straight between the Ostkurve and Senna chicane were cut and the rest was connected with a new long straight called the "Parabolika", with a small kink being added between the first straight and the new one. A small right-left-right complex was added to the remaining part of the final straight, with a new grandstand overlooking it. In an extremely controversial move, the old forest section was torn up and replanted with trees, eliminating any chance of using the old course either for future F1 events or for historic car events.

There was and still remains a great deal of criticism of the track redesign, in terms of ruining the previous unique technical challenges of the old Hockenheim circuit and delivering a new homogenised "assembly line" circuit without the character of the previous layout, whilst being beset by the perceived problems of other Tilke circuits. Several drivers and team principals, including Ron Dennis, Jarno Trulli and Juan Pablo Montoya, criticised the changes and stated their preference for the old circuit.

The change in the track layout also saw the installation of a new memorial to Jim Clark. This is located at the outside of the current track's turn 2, where the old track continued out into the forests, and the new shortened track turns to the right.

The new track has a seating capacity of 120,000, due to new large grandstands sponsored by Mercedes-Benz. The complex also features a quarter-mile track for drag racing. It hosts one of the largest drag racing events in Europe, known as the NitrOlympx, and was one of the last Top Fuel circuits to race to  before the FIA switched the nitro categories to the now-recognised  distance in 2012.

Formula One
The Hockenheim Circuit hosted the German Grand Prix for the first time in 1970 when the F1 drivers decided at the French Grand Prix to boycott the allegedly dangerous Nürburgring unless major changes were made. The next year the German Grand Prix went back to the Nürburgring until the 1976 German Grand Prix.

In July 2006, Bernie Ecclestone announced that from 2007 onwards, there would be only one Grand Prix per year in Germany. Since , there had been two Grands Prix every year in Germany; the German Grand Prix at Hockenheim, plus either the European Grand Prix or the Luxembourg Grand Prix at the Nürburgring. From 2007, the Nürburgring and Hockenheimring alternated hosting the German Grand Prix, starting with the Nürburgring in 2007.

Ongoing deficits of the Formula One races, amounting to up to 5.3 million Euro per race that had to be covered by the local communities, made it likely the contract between the Hockenheimring and Formula One Management would not be extended after the Grand Prix of 2010. However, in October 2009 the contract for the circuit to hold the German GP was extended to 2018, with the FOA agreeing to cover any losses the event incurs. Neither Hockenheim nor the Nürburgring hosted a Grand Prix in 2015 or 2017 after the Nürburgring failed to complete an agreement with Formula 1's commercial rights holder Bernie Ecclestone.

Drag racing (NitrolympX – Rico Anthes Quartermile)

From 1986 to 1988, the start–finish straight was used for 1/8 mile drag racing. In 1989, a proper drag strip was built by connecting the Opel-Kurve and the first turn entering the Motodrom section. The finish line was at the beginning of the forest, with a very long run-off on the straight in the forest. Competitors had to travel around the full race track in opposite direction to return to the paddock.

The drag strip is only used for two events in August, the Public Race Days and the  main event a week later. Originally named the Nitrolympics and featuring Top Fuel dragsters, it was renamed to NitrolympX.

When the Hockenheimring was shortened in 2002, the drag strip was moved back, closer to the new tall Tower stands that allow an unusual view along the drag strip. Even though the run off was cut in half it remains one of the longest in drag racing. The NitrolympX usually host most European Drag Racing Championship, sanctioned by FIA or FIM, plus jet dragsters and other entertaining events on the Saturday night show that draws 40,000 spectators.

The drag strip in 2008 was christened Rico Anthes Quartermile after the German former Top Fuel driver and long-time organizer of the NitrolympX had retired in 2007. As the dragstrip can only be prepared for professional drag racing after the last major circuit event, mainly the Formula One race, the grip is often sub par compared to permanent drag strips that host two Euro Championship events each year, like Santa Pod Raceway in England or Tierp Arena in Sweden. The best performances on the full quarter-mile were significantly below those in Santa Pod, and the best ET was set in 2005: 4.873 sec. and 458 km/h by Brady Kalivoda (USA).

In 2012, some Pro classes could not find traction as Formula One had demanded a new surface. In subsequent years, the organizers provided a better track, with support from Santa Pod personnel and machinery. In 2016, Hockenheim, and mainland Europe, finally saw the first 3-second Top Fuel 1000 ft passes, with 3.939 sec. and 486.91 km/h by Anita Mäkelä (FIN). An overall European record for Super Street Bike was set by Garry Bowe (GB) with 7.04s 340,69 km/h.

DTM
The DTM (Deutsche Tourenwagen Masters) series has regularly raced at the Hockenheimring since its revival in 2000. In most years, the DTM has competed there twice during a season.

Rallycross
Located in the stadia section of the track, the rallycross track uses a section of track from turns 11 to 16, combined with a dirt section in front of the grandstands. It hosted first ever World RX of Hockenheim, round 2 of FIA World Rallycross Championship in 2015 as supporting event of DTM. WRX also combined with the DTM for an event there in 2017.

Layout history

Current circuit configurations

Previous configurations

Lap records
Official record lap times are only set during the race. The fastest ever lap on the track is 1:11.212 set by Sebastian Vettel in a Ferrari SF71H during qualifying at the 2018 German Grand Prix. The official race lap records at the Hockenheimring are listed as:

Events

 Current

 March: DMV Goodyear Racing Days
 April: Prototype Cup Germany, Preis der Stadt Stuttgart, ADAC Racing Weekend Hockenheim
 May: BOSS GP Hockenheim Historic, Ultimate Cup 500kms of Hockenheim
 June: ADAC GT Masters, Porsche Carrera Cup Germany, Porsche Carrera Cup Benelux
 September: GT World Challenge Europe, GT4 European Series, IDM Superbike Championship
 October: Deutsche Tourenwagen Masters, Formula Regional European Championship, ADAC GT Masters, Porsche Carrera Cup Germany

 Former
 24H Series 12 Hours of Hockenheimring (2020–2022)
 Euroformula Open Championship (2019)
 European Formula 5000 Championship (1969–1971)
 European Formula Two Championship (1967–1984)
 European Touring Car Championship (1986, 2004)
 FIA Formula 3 European Championship (2011–2018)
 FIA GT Championship (1997–1999, 2004)
 FIA World Rallycross Championship World RX of Hockenheim (2015–2017)
 FIM Endurance World Championship (1986)
 Formula 750 (1973, 1975–1979)
 Formula One German Grand Prix (1970, 1977–1984, 1986–2006, 2008, 2010, 2012, 2014, 2016, 2018–2019)
 Formula Renault Eurocup (2004, 2010, 2018–2020)
 Grand Prix motorcycle racing
 Baden-Württemberg motorcycle Grand Prix (1986)
 German motorcycle Grand Prix (1957, 1959, 1961, 1966–1967, 1969, 1971, 1973, 1975, 1977, 1979, 1981–1983, 1985, 1987, 1989, 1991–1994)
 GP2 Series (2005-2006, 2008, 2010, 2012, 2014, 2016)
 GP3 Series (2010, 2012, 2014, 2016)
 GT2 European Series (2021)
 International Formula 3000 (1990–2004)
 International GT Open (2019)
 NASCAR Whelen Euro Series (2017–2019)
 Porsche Supercup (1993–2006, 2008, 2010, 2012, 2014, 2016, 2018–2019)
 Sidecar World Championship (1957, 1959, 1961, 1963, 1966–1969, 1971, 1973, 1975, 1977, 1979, 1981–1983, 1985–1987, 1989, 1991–1994, 1999–2000)
 Superbike World Championship (1988–1997, 1999–2000)
 TCR Europe Touring Car Series (2016, 2019)
 TCR International Series (2016)
 W Series (2019)
 World Sportscar Championship (1966–1967, 1977, 1985)

Music events
Michael Jackson
Bad World Tour – 10 July 1988
HIStory World Tour – 10 August 1997
Tina Turner – Foreign Affair: The Farewell Tour – 26 August 1990
Pink Floyd – The Division Bell Tour – 13 August 1994
The Rolling Stones
Voodoo Lounge Tour – 19 August 1995
Licks Tour and 22 June 2003 with AC/DC
AC/DC
Stiff Upper Lip World Tour, with Buddy Guy, Die Toten Hosen & Megadeth – 10 June 2001
Black Ice World Tour – 22 May 2009
Rock or Bust World Tour – 16 May 2015
Robbie Williams – Close Encounters Tour – 12–13 August 2006
Sonisphere Festival, headlined by Metallica – 2009
Hardwell - 2016
Ed Sheeran – ÷ Tour – 22–23 June 2019

Fatal accidents
 1968 Jim Clark, during a Formula 2 race
 1972 Bert Hawthorne, during a Formula 2 race
 1980 Markus Höttinger, during a Formula 2 race
 1980 Patrick Depailler, during a private test session
 1986 Tony Boden, during a drag racing meeting
 2014 Albert Fleming, during the Bosch Hockenheim Historic

References

External links

 The official website of the Hockenheimring (English version)
 Hockenheimring Circuit History and Statistics The Formula One Database
 Circuit Guide – Hockenheim, Germany BBC Sport, 17 February 2006
 Onboard video of one lap of Hockenheimring (MP4, 9,7 MB) Fastvoice
 Chronos Hockenheim Court Absolute Cars – Hockenheim Short Power Laps
 The Hockenheimring on Google Maps (Current Formula 1 Tracks)
 The History of the Hockenheimring Official website
 Official Facebook page
 Live webcam of the circuit Official website

Superbike World Championship circuits
Formula One circuits
Grand Prix motorcycle circuits
German Grand Prix
Motorsport venues in Baden-Württemberg
Drag racing venues in Europe
World Rallycross circuits
Sports venues in Baden-Württemberg